Mer's Lips is a 1992 Indonesian film directed by Arifin C. Noer. It was Indonesia's submission to the 65th Academy Awards for the Academy Award for Best Foreign Language Film, but was not accepted as a nominee.

See also
 Cinema of Indonesia
 List of submissions to the 65th Academy Awards for Best Foreign Language Film
 List of Indonesian submissions for the Academy Award for Best Foreign Language Film

References

External links
 

1992 films
Indonesian drama films
1991 drama films
1991 films
Films shot in Indonesia
Films directed by Arifin C. Noer
1992 drama films